The 1997 Central European flood or the 1997 Oder Flood of the Oder and Morava river basins in July 1997 affected Poland, the Czech Republic and Germany, taking the lives of 114 people and causing material damages estimated at $4.5 billion (3.8 billion euros in the Czech Republic and Poland and 330 million euros in Germany). The flooding began in the Czech Republic, then spread to Poland and Germany. In Poland, where it was one of the most disastrous floods in the country's history, it was named the Millennium Flood (Powódź tysiąclecia). The term was also used in Germany (Jahrtausendflut). The event has also been referred to as the Great Flood of 1997.

Causes

Southwestern Poland and the northeastern Czech Republic experienced two periods of extensive rainfall, first occurring 3–10 July and second 17–22 July. The precipitation was caused by a Genoa low pressure system, which moved from northern Italy to Moravia and Poland. The unusual development occurred when a field of higher air pressure between the Azores Islands and Scandinavia was blocked. The center of low pressure remained over southern Poland for a long period of time.

Water levels rose 2–3 m above previously recorded averages and were so high that they caused the water to flow over existing measurement poles. It was one of the heaviest rainfalls in recorded world's history. It was dubbed the Millennium Flood because a likelihood of such a flood in a particular year was estimated at 0.1%.

Floods

Flooding began on 5 July in the Czech Republic and spread to Poland on 6 July. Those early floods were very rapid flash floods (water levels rose by up to four meters in half a day). In Poland, the first settlements flooded were located around Prudnik and Głuchołazy, and were visited by Polish Prime Minister Włodzimierz Cimoszewicz on 7 July. Flooding spread rapidly from Chałupki to Racibórz. In Kłodzko several buildings dating back a few hundred years (kamienica) collapsed; on 8 July the flood reached Krapkowice. In the second stage of the flood, the flood wave flowed down through the Oder river, submerging successive towns in the area. Left-bank Opole was flooded on 10 July, Wrocław and Rybnik on 12 July, and Głogów soon after. The rising waters slowed by the time they reached the Polish-German border (the Oder-Neisse line), allowing more time for preparations; the damages were thus much lower.

On 18 July, Polish president Aleksander Kwaśniewski declared a day of national mourning.

Water levels

Water levels recorded on the Oder river in the flood period:

Fatalities and damages

The flood caused the deaths of 114 people (56 in Poland, 50 in the Czech Republic) and material damages estimated at $4.5 billion (3.8 billion euros in the Czech Republic and Poland and 330 million euros in Germany).

In Poland, it is estimated that 7,000 people lost all of their possessions. 9,000 private businesses were affected and 680,000 houses were damaged or destroyed. The flood also damaged 843 schools (100 destroyed), 4,000 bridges (45 destroyed), 14,400 km of roads and 2,000 km of railways. In total, 665,835 hectares were affected in Poland (an estimated 2% of total Polish territory). The losses were estimated at 7.4-11.3 billion Polish zlotys (or US$2.3–3.5 billion at the 1997 levels). The historic town of Kłodzko sustained damages equivalent to 50 years of its annual budget.

In the Czech Republic, 2,151 flats and 48 bridges were destroyed. 538 villages and towns were affected. The losses were estimated at 63 billion Czech crowns. The town of Troubky was most severely affected.

In Germany there were no fatalities.

Responses
Government responses in the Czech Republic and Poland were criticized. The flood revealed various inadequacies in decision making and infrastructure, although the unprecedented magnitude of the disaster was seen by some as a mitigating factor.

Numerous charities provided aid to those affected by the floods.

In popular culture
In the wake of the floods in 1997, Polish rock band Hey released the song Moja i twoja nadzieja ("My and Your Hope"). All proceeds from the sale of the single went towards victims of the floods. Hey also brought together a group of the most prominent Polish singers at the time to record a cover of the song (known as the "'97 version") for charity-. Also in 1997, Hey released the album  ("A Brick for Flood Victims"), containing five versions of the song - Hey's original single, the '97 version, an instrumental cover, an acoustic cover, and a jazz interpretation (by Anna Maria Jopek).

In October 2022, Netflix released High Water, a Polish-language six-episode limited series inspired by the 1997 flood. Set in Wrocław, Poland, it depicts the lead-up to the floods and reactions by the city and regional authorities, as well as inhabitants of surrounding villages (represented by the fictional village of Kęty). Although directors Jan Holoubek and Bartłomiej Ignaciuk emphasised that the series was not a documentary, they have been praised for the authenticity of the series.

See also

2010 Central European floods
European floods: 2002, 2005, 2006, 2009
List of floods in Europe

References

External links

The Flood of the Millennium in Wrocław, July 1997 
Flood in Poland. Poland needs help! (historical)

Oder Flood, 1997
Oder Flood, 1997
Oder Flood, 1997
Oder Flood, 1997
Floods in Poland
Floods in Germany
Floods in Europe
Floods in the Czech Republic
Genoa lows
July 1997 events in Europe